Hangin may be
John Gombojab Hangin (1921–1989), scholar of Mongolian studies
An alternative spelling of Hanjin, South Korean company
Hangin', 1982 album by Chic
Hangin' (Bastille song), 2015 pop song by Bastille

See also
Hanging